Pleurotus eryngii (also known as king trumpet mushroom, French horn mushroom, eryngi, king oyster mushroom, king brown mushroom, boletus of the steppes, trumpet royale, aliʻi oyster) is an edible mushroom native to Mediterranean regions of Europe, the Middle East, and North Africa, but also grown in many parts of Asia.

Description
Pleurotus eryngii is the largest species in the oyster mushroom genus, Pleurotus, which also contains the oyster mushroom Pleurotus ostreatus. It has a thick, meaty white stem and a small tan cap (in young specimens). Its natural range extends from the Atlantic Ocean through the Mediterranean Basin and Central Europe into Western Asia and India. Unlike other species of Pleurotus, which are primarily wood-decay fungi, the P. eryngii complex are also weak parasites on the roots of herbaceous plants, although they may also be cultured on organic wastes.

Taxonomy
Its species name is derived from the fact that it grows in association with the roots of Eryngium campestre or other Eryngium plants (English names: 'sea holly' or 'eryngo'). P. eryngii is a species complex, and a number of varieties have been described, with differing plant associates in the carrot family (Apiaceae).
 Pleurotus eryngii var. eryngii (DC.) Quél 1872 – associated with Eryngium ssp.
 Pleurotus eryngii var. ferulae (Lanzi) Sacc. 1887 – associated with Ferula communis
 Pleurotus eryngii var. tingitanus Lewinsohn 2002 – associated with Ferula tingitana
 Pleurotus eryngii var. elaeoselini Venturella, Zervakis & La Rocca 2000 – associated with Elaeoselinum asclepium
 Pleurotus eryngii var. thapsiae Venturella, Zervakis & Saitta 2002 – associated with Thapsia garganica
Other specimens of P. eryngii have been reported in association with plants in the genera Ferulago, Cachrys, Laserpitium, and Diplotaenia, all in Apiaceae.

Molecular studies have shown Pleurotus nebrodensis to be closely related to, but distinct from, P. eryngii. Pleurotus fossulatus may be another closely related species.

Uses
The mushroom has a good shelf life and is cultivated widely. It has little flavor or aroma when raw. When cooked, it develops rich umami flavor and a meaty texture. When cultivating Random amplified polymorphic DNA (RAPD) can be used in the mushroom industry for the classification and maintenance of high-quality mushroom spawns. P. eryngii, are commercially produced, edible mushrooms, with P. eryngii making up 30% of the Korean edible mushroom market since its introduction in 1995. It is commonly used as a meat substitute in many vegan recipes.

Pleurotus eryngii may contain chemicals that stimulate the immune system. Dietary intake of Pleurotus eryngii may function as cholesterol-lowering dietary agent.

Like some other Pleurotus species, P. eryngii attacks nematodes and may provide a control method for these parasites when they infect cats and dogs.

It is very frequently used in Apulian cuisine. An example of this is when it is put on top of orecchiette.

Verification of the species

Sequence analysis of the ITS1–5.8S rDNA–ITS2 of P. eryngii and the control strains P. ostreatus and P. ferulae, demonstrated that the DNA regions share almost 99% of sequence identity, indicating closely related mushroom strains. ITS1–5.8S rDNA–ITS2 sequence analysis is DNA sequencing used to confirm the mushroom species at hand, although it does distinguish variants in the mushroom species. RAPD are superior to DNA sequence-based methods with distinguishing strains in species. To verify the mushroom strains RAPD was used, and DNA fragments were amplified from the total cellular DNA. Verification of Pleurotus eryngii strains was assessed using ITS sequence analysis and RAPD fingerprinting. Analysis of the DNA fragment pattern showed that the 22 P. eryngii strains were clearly distinguished from the control strains P. ostreatus and P. ferulae, and could be categorized into five subgroups:
 Group 1- commonly showed widely spaced gills under the convex cap. They tended to form small fruiting bodies. Eastern Europe. 24-25C optimum growth 
 Group 2- funnel-shaped cap phenotype with a stout stem. Members in this group grew faster than other mushrooms. They required 15–16 d from the fructification for harvest whereas the others required 18–21 d.
 Group 3- shared similar morphological characteristics; they formed thin fruiting bodies with a small convex cap. Strains KNR2514 and KNR 2522 
 Group 4- resembled group I mushrooms morphologically but grew at around 27 °C.
 Group 5- was collected from Iran; they grew as mycelia but hardly formed fruiting bodies. In this group, we only succeeded in generating fruiting bodies for KNR2517, which had a wide, white, convex cap. Their optimal growth temperature was the lowest among the strains tested (19–21 °C), which may reflect their geographical origin.

Evolution
Pleurotus populations growing on umbellifers seem to have recently diverged through a sympatric speciation process, that is based on both intrinsic reproductive barriers and extrinsic ecogeographical factors.

Pleurotus eryngii is a saprotrophic fungus. Saprotrophic fungi use the process of chemoheterotrophic extracellular digestion involved in the processing of decayed organic matter. They are also an NTF, nematode-trapping fungi, that survives by trapping and digesting nematodes working as a natural pesticide. These fungi produce trapping devices to capture, kill, and digest nematodes as food sources. Traps are not only the weapons that NTF use to capture and infect nematodes but also an important indicator of their switch from a saprophytic to a predacious lifestyle. Pleurotus eryngii can live both saprophytically on organic matter and as predators by capturing tiny animals. The development of traps shows their evolutionary importance of them. They provide a crucial role in obtaining nutrients and may confer competitive advantages over non-predatory fungi. This fungal carnivorism diverged from saprophytism about 419 million years ago (Mya), after the origin of nematodes about 550–600 Mya. This following evolution of the fungi after the nematode suggests the co-evolution of the species. Phylogenetic analysis suggested that NTF have a common ancestor and the ability to capture nematodes has been an important trait for speciation and diversification within the clade.

P. eryngii extract reduced the number of Panagrellus sp. larvae after 24 h by 90%.  P. eryngii fungus has predatory activity against Panagrellus sp. larvae due to toxin production and negatively affects Meloidogyne javanica eggs and juveniles development.

See also
Medicinal fungi
List of Pleurotus species

Notes

References

Sources

External links

Pleurotus eryngii photos

Pleurotaceae
Fungi of Europe
Edible fungi
Parasitic fungi
Carnivorous fungi
Fungi in cultivation